The 98th Illinois General Assembly convened on January 9, 2013, and adjourned sine die on January 13, 2015. Elected in 2012, it was the first General Assembly to reflect the new legislative districts enacted by the previous 97th Illinois General Assembly in 2011, which shifted the map in the Democratic Party's favor.

Legislation 

The 98th General Assembly enacted a total of 1,175 bills into law.  Notable among these was the Illinois Religious Freedom and Marriage Fairness Act, which removed legal barriers to same-sex marriage in Illinois. The House of Representatives passed the bill by a 61–54 vote on November 5, 2013, and the Senate passed it by a 32–21 vote. The governor signed the bill into law on November 20, and the law took effect on June 1, 2014.

The General Assembly also passed the Illinois Bill of Rights for the Homeless, which made Illinois the second state to ban discrimination against the homeless.

The General Assembly also passed the Firearm Concealed Carry Act (FCCA), a change to Illinois gun law that made Illinois the last state in the country to enact concealed carry.  Passed over the governor's veto, the FCCA took effect "mere hours before the seventh circuit's deadline" in Moore v. Madigan.

Late in the legislative session, the General Assembly passed a bill that changes the original Illinois wiretapping law adding that in order to commit a criminal offense, a person must be recording "in a surreptitious manner". On December 30, 2014, Governor Quinn signed the bill into law as Public Act 098-1142. The bill's sponsors, Elaine Nekritz and Kwame Raoul, claimed the law upholds the rights of citizens to record in public.

The General Assembly approved five ballot measures for the 2014 Illinois general election, an unusually large number for the state, including three advisory referendums and two constitutional amendments. The constitutional amendments, Marsy's Law and the Illinois Right to Vote Amendment, both passed with the required 60% majority of the popular vote.

Senate

The members of the Senate were elected in the 2012 Illinois Senate election.  Because this was the first election following the decennial redistricting, senators were elected from all 59 districts, with one-third of the Senate being elected to two-year terms while the others were elected to four-year terms.

Senate leadership

Party composition 

The Senate of the 98th General Assembly consisted of 19 Republicans and 40 Democrats.

State Senators

House

Party composition

The House of the 98th General Assembly consisted of 47 Republicans and 71 Democrats.

House leadership

State Representatives

References 

2013 in Illinois
2014 in Illinois
Illinois legislative sessions
2013 U.S. legislative sessions
2014 U.S. legislative sessions